Results and statistics from Maria Sharapova's 2009 tennis season.

Yearly summary

Pre-comeback 
At the beginning of the year, Sharapova was forced to concede the defence of her Australian Open title, a decision which would see her drop out of the WTA's Top 10 for the first time since winning Wimbledon in 2004. Her continued absence from the Tour also cost her the titles she won in Doha and Amelia Island last year; she also missed both the Premier Mandatory events at Indian Wells and Miami, and subsequently saw her world ranking drop to No. 65.

Sharapova first attempted her comeback by playing doubles with Elena Vesnina at Indian Wells (she did not play in the singles tournament). This decision would backfire, as they lost to fellow Russians Ekaterina Makarova and Tatiana Poutchek in three sets in the first round.

Comeback to tennis 
In May, it was announced that she would be making her comeback at the Warsaw Open, which she entered as a wild card entry. She eventually reached the quarter-finals, losing to eventual finalist Alona Bondarenko. In the week during which the tournament was held, though, her world ranking dropped to No. 126, her lowest ranking since 2003, but her run in Warsaw saw her rise to No. 102 in the world rankings.

French Open 
Sharapova entered the 2009 French Open unseeded at a Major for the first time since the 2003 US Open. In the second round, she defeated 11th seed Nadia Petrova 6–2, 1–6, 8–6. She went on to reach the quarter-finals, where she suffered her worst defeat at a Major tournament, losing to Dominika Cibulková and winning only two games (she had to defend a match point at 0–6, 0–5 down in the second set, in the process avoiding her second career double bagel defeat). Despite the defeat, Sharapova moved back into the World's Top 100 in the rankings.

Grass court season 
Sharapova started her grass court season at Birmingham, where she had won her first grass court title five years earlier. Unseeded, she defeated Stéphanie Dubois, Alexa Glatch, seventh seed and future Wimbledon quarter-finalist Francesca Schiavone and Yanina Wickmayer to reach the semi-finals, before being defeated by Li Na there. Her run in Birmingham brought her ranking back into the Top 60.

As it was in 2008, her Wimbledon campaign would once again turn out to be short-lived, as she was defeated in the second round by Gisela Dulko in three sets.

US Open series 
Sharapova next played at the 2009 Bank of the West Classic, where she defeated Ai Sugiyama and Nadia Petrova before being defeated by Venus Williams in the final eight.

She next played at Los Angeles, where she recorded her first career victory against Victoria Azarenka before falling in three sets to eventual champion Flavia Pennetta in the semi-finals. She then reached her first final since April 2008 at the Rogers Cup, falling there to Elena Dementieva in straight sets.

To conclude the US Open series, she competed at the US Open as the 29th seed; this was her lowest seeding at a Major tournament since the 2004 Australian Open. She defeated Tsvetana Pironkova and Christina McHale for the loss of three games each in the first two rounds, but was then stunned in the third round by little-known Melanie Oudin in three sets.

Fall series 
Sharapova picked up her first title since April 2008, when she won the Toray Pan Pacific Open event in Tokyo after her Serbian opponent Jelena Janković retired at 2–5 down in the first set. This marked her 20th career singles title. At Beijing, her final tournament of the season, she received a bye into the second round, where she defeated Victoria Azarenka in three sets, before falling to Peng Shuai in the third. Her impressive comeback eventually led to her finishing the year ranked World No. 14, having been No. 126 back in May.

All matches 
This table chronicles all the matches of Sharapova in 2009, including walkovers (W/O) which the WTA does not count as wins. They are marked ND for non-decision or no decision.

Singles matches

Tournament schedule

Singles Schedule

Yearly Records

Head-to-head matchups 
Ordered by percentage, number of victories to number of losses, then in alphabetical order

  Nadia Petrova 3–0
  Victoria Azarenka 2–0
  Alisa Kleybanova 2–0
  Agnieszka Radwańska 2–0
  Francesca Schiavone 2–0
  Alona Bondarenko 1–1
  Li Na 1–1
  Sybille Bammer 1–0
  Iveta Benešová 1–0
  Stéphanie Dubois 1–0
  Tathiana Garbin 1–0
  Jarmila Groth 1–0
  Jelena Janković 1–0
  Mariya Koryttseva 1–0
  Darya Kustova 1–0
  Viktoriya Kutuzova 1–0
  Christina McHale 1–0
  Tsvetana Pironkova 1–0
  Urszula Radwańska 1–0
  Yaroslava Shvedova 1–0
  Samantha Stosur 1–0
  Ai Sugiyama 1–0
  Yanina Wickmayer 1–0
  Anastasiya Yakimova 1–0
  Vera Zvonareva 1–0
  Dominika Cibulková 0–1
  Elena Dementieva 0–1
  Gisela Dulko 0–1
  Melanie Oudin 0–1
  Flavia Pennetta 0–1
  Peng Shuai 0–1
  Venus Williams 0–1

Finals

Singles: 2 (1–1)

See also 
 2009 Serena Williams tennis season
 2009 WTA Tour

References

External links 

Maria Sharapova tennis seasons
Sharapova tennis season
2009 in Russian tennis